The Gorlin sign is a medical term that indicates the ability to touch the tip of the nose or chin with the tongue. Approximately 34 percent of the general population can perform this act, whereas fifty percent of people with the inherited connective tissue disorder, Ehlers–Danlos syndrome, can. Named after pathologist Robert J. Gorlin, it should not be confused with Gorlin syndrome, a serious inherited medical condition also named after him.

References

External links
 

Symptoms and signs: musculoskeletal system